Antix Productions is a television production company founded by Yvette Fielding and Karl Beattie in 2001. The company have produced shows for broadcasters such as Living and ITV in the UK and Travel Channel in the United States. Their output includes successful shows such as Most Haunted and its various sister shows such as Most Haunted Live!.

Originally, Antix Productions was based in Cheadle in the Metropolitan Borough of Stockport, Greater Manchester, but relocated to an office within MediaCityUK in Salford, Greater Manchester in 2011.

Productions

Most Haunted
Most Haunted
Most Haunted Live!
Most Haunted Extra
Most Haunted: Recurring Nightmares

Other
 Ghosthunting with...
 The Ride
 Pop Talk
 Celebrity Daredevils
 Celebrity Ghost Stories UK
 Death in Venice
 Living with Yvette and Karl
 Spook School
 The Enfield Poltergeist
 Ghosthunters

The Paranormal Channel
In 2008, Antix Productions launched The Paranormal Channel. The channel (launched 9 June 2008) broadcast a mix of programmes on the paranormal including documentaries, films and dramas. The channel was subsequently renamed the Unexplained Channel.  However, in April 2010, the Unexplained Channel ceased broadcasting, with its EPG slot on Sky Digital being purchased by Information TV.

References

Mass media companies established in 2001
Television production companies of the United Kingdom
Mass media in the Metropolitan Borough of Stockport